Refrigerator (1988–1999) was an Appendix Quarter Horse racehorse who won the Champions of Champions race three times. He was a 1988 bay gelding sired by Rare Jet and out of Native Parr. Rare Jet was a grandson of Easy Jet and also a double descendant of both Depth Charge (TB) and Three Bars (TB). His dam was a daughter of Heisanative, a son of Raise a Native (TB) and a grandson of Native Dancer (TB). During his race career he earned over $2 million and won twenty-two races, eleven of them stakes races. He won the 1990 All American Futurity. Nine of the stakes races were Grade I races. He was bred by Sonny Vaughn, and died in February 1999.

Refrigerator was inducted into the AQHA Hall of Fame in 2000.

Notes

References

 All Breed Pedigree Database Pedigree of Refrigerator accessed on October 6, 2007
 American Quarter Horse Foundation – Refrigerator accessed on September 17, 2017
 AQHA Hall of Fame accessed on September 2, 2017
 Refrigerator at Quarter Horse Directory accessed on October 6, 2007

External links
 Refrigerator at Quarter Horse Legends

1988 racehorse births
1999 racehorse deaths
American Quarter Horse racehorses
Racehorses bred in the United States
Racehorses trained in the United States
AQHA Hall of Fame (horses)